Truppführer is the German term for the position of a unit/troop leader.

Relief organization and disaster control service 
In relief organizations, disaster control services, search and rescue teams, or technical assistance organizations, the Truppführer leads a small team of three to five individuals, usually contractors. The Truppführer is normally managed by a Gruppenführer, and acts as deputy or assistant Gruppenführer. At least two Trupps build a Gruppe (en: group).

Fire brigade 

In German fire-brigades, the Truppführer leads a team of up to two fireman. The proper name Feuerwehrtrupp (en: fire-brigade team) is the designation to the smallest firefighter sub-unit. The number of individuals per Feuerwehrtrupp may vary.

A fire-brigade Truppführer may also act as leader of a self-contained Feuerwehrtrupp, handling special missions and can proceed in the role as commander of the vehicle crew. In this function he may be superior to one Truppmann (en: Troop man) and one Maschinist (en: Machine man). The Truppführer of self-contained Feuerwehrtrupp is also qualified to act on higher qualification in the role as Gruppenführer.

Responsibilities 
 meet the goals and objectives of the particular mission
 lead the Trupp in line in accordance with the security and safety of live regulations

Bundeswehr 

Truppführer (short: TrpFr) may be the appointment or function designation of a person in uniform in the modern day German Bundeswehr. Normally one is authorized, mandated and competent to command, control, or lead (permanent or temporary) a Trupp (sub-subunit or small military team below platoon level) that – depending on the service, branch, or branch of service – normally contains two to six members.

Corresponding designations to Trupp / Truppführer in Anglophone armed forces are “party“, “patrol“ or “team“ (e.g. support team, machine gun teams, mortar teams, sniper teams, … etc.) / “leader“ (short: … LDR, L).

In the Bundeswehr some Trupps form a Gruppe (en: group); three to four groups build a Zug (en: platoon). To the appointment of Truppführer might be assigned normally an enlisted rank (up to OR-3) or a junior NCO (OR-4). However, in the German special command and support troops (de: Führungsunterstützungstruppen) a Truppführer might be appointed higher ranks as well.

Examples to Truppführer / sub-unit leader 
 Mechanised infantry (de:Panzergrenadiertruppe): Truppführer Schützentrupp (from the armoured vehicle dismounted Schützentrupp)
 Signal troops (de: Fernmeldetruppe): Funktruppführer
 Maintenance troops (de:Instandsetzungstruppe): Instandsetzungstruppführer
 Artillery troops (de: Artillerietruppe): Geschützführer (commander of a gun crew)
 Armoured troops (de: Panzertruppe): Panzerkommandant (crew commander of an armoured vehicle / battle tank)
 Company/ Battery troop commander (de: Kompanietruppführer / Batterietruppführer: commands as sub-unit leader the Kompanietrupp, respectively in *artillery troops and anti aircraft troops the Battery troop (de: Batterietrupp (new: Stabsdienstbearbeiter SK (StDstBeabr SK))

Designation 
Military symbol – Trupp / Truppführer (2 – 7 men) – in NATO-armed forces:
 One single point (● Trupp / Truppführer general); respectively
 One lying rectangle with one point above (Trupp as single sub-unit) on military maps

See also 
 Comparative ranks of Nazi Germany

References 

Military ranks of Germany
Titles